Andreas Stähle (born 14 February 1965) is an East German sprint canoer who competed from the mid-1980s to the early 1990s. He won two medals at the 1988 Summer Olympics in Seoul with a silver in the K-1 500 m and a bronze in the K-4 1000 m events.

Stähle also won seven medals at the ICF Canoe Sprint World Championships with three golds (K-1 500 m: 1985, K-4 500 m: 1983, 1986), three silvers (K-1 500 m: 1987, K-4 500 m: 1990, K-4 1000 m: 1983), and a bronze (K-1 500 m: 1983).

References
DatabaseOlympics.com profile

1965 births
Canoeists at the 1988 Summer Olympics
East German male canoeists
German male canoeists
Living people
Olympic canoeists of East Germany
Olympic silver medalists for East Germany
Olympic bronze medalists for East Germany
Olympic medalists in canoeing
ICF Canoe Sprint World Championships medalists in kayak

Medalists at the 1988 Summer Olympics